The Muldor-Miller House is a historic stone farmhouse located in Claverack, Columbia County, New York, United States.

Description and history 

Built c.1790, it has "unusual stone construction" and "is a rare surviving example of an early house in Claverack."

It is Federal and Greek Revival in style.

It was added to the National Register of Historic Places in 2022.

References 

Houses on the National Register of Historic Places in New York (state)
Federal architecture in New York (state)
Greek Revival architecture in New York (state)
Houses completed in 1790
Houses in Columbia County, New York
National Register of Historic Places in Columbia County, New York
Claverack, New York
Stone houses in New York (state)